János Bökfi (born 2 June 1963) is a Hungarian weightlifter. He competed in the men's heavyweight I event at the 1988 Summer Olympics.

References

External links
 

1963 births
Living people
Hungarian male weightlifters
Olympic weightlifters of Hungary
Weightlifters at the 1988 Summer Olympics
Sportspeople from Békés County
People from Füzesgyarmat